Prasophyllum alpestre, commonly known as the mauve leek orchid, is a species of orchid endemic to eastern Australia. It has a single tubular, green leaf and up to twenty five scented, white, purplish and green flowers. It grows in subalpine parts of New South Wales, Victoria and Tasmania.

Description
As with others in the genus, the flowers are inverted so that the labellum is above the column rather than below it. Flowering occurs from November to March, making it one of the last of its genus to flower.

Taxonomy and naming
Prasophyllum alpestre was first formally described in 1998 by David Jones from a specimen collected at Charlottes Pass in the Kosciuszko National Park and the description was published in Australian Orchid Research. The specific epithet (alpestre) is a Latin word meaning "of high mountains" referring the habitat of this species. Rudie Kuiter argues that Prasophyllum alpestre is a re-identification of Prasophyllum suttonii, and should instead be a junior synonym.

Distribution and habitat
The mauve leek orchid grows in grassland and herbfields in moist areas and in woodland with snow gums (Eucalyptus pauciflora). It is found in subalpine regions of New South Wales, Victoria and Tasmania.

References

alpestre
Flora of New South Wales
Flora of Victoria (Australia)
Flora of Tasmania
Endemic orchids of Australia
Plants described in 1998